Laguna Krah Asia, also known as Laguna Heroes Krah Asia for sponsorship reasons with Krah Asia, are a professional basketball team in the Maharlika Pilipinas Basketball League (MPBL).

History

Current roster

Depth chart

Head coaches

All-time roster

 Ryan Buenafe (2018–present)
 Rex Leynes (2018–present)
 Michael Mabulac (2018–present)
 Dennis Miranda (2018–present)
 Jai Reyes (2018–present)

Season-by-season records
Records from the 2021 MPBL Invitational:

References

2018 establishments in the Philippines
Basketball teams established in 2018
Maharlika Pilipinas Basketball League teams